Bahuman is a village located in the district of [Sheikhupura] near the M-3 Motorway.
The [Great Kharal] tribe is mainly found in this area.

See also
 Pindi Bhattian Tehsil
 Thatta Khero Matmal
 Hafiz Abad

Hafizabad District
Villages in Hafizabad District